Julio César Castro, also known as Juceca (Montevideo, 6 May 1928 – Ib., 11 September 2003) was a Uruguayan comedian, narrator, actor and  dramatist. He was mainly known by his character Don Verídico, with which he developed a particular type of absurd humour tied to the rural world.

His stories were also made famous in Argentina, thanks to the humorist Luis Landriscina.

Works 
 Los cuentos de Don Verídico, Editorial Arca, 1972.
 La vuelta de Don Verídico, Editorial Arca, 1977.
 Entretanto cuento (30th anniversary of Don Verídico, unpublished stories), Editorial Arca 1992.
 Don Verídico, Editorial Arca 1994.
 Don Verídico: Antología, Ediciones de la Banda Oriental, 1995.
 Los cuentos de Don Verídico, Archivo General de la Nación, Centro de Difusión del Libro, 1997. -Buenos Aires-
 Don Verídico se la cuenta, Editorial de la Flor, 1975.
 Más cuentos de Don Verídico, Editorial Neo Gráfica, 1982.
 Don Verídico: Recopilación, Editorial Imaginador, 1996.
 Nadie entiende nada
 Seawards Journey (2003)
 Hay Barullo en el Resorte, 2005, posthumous work with unpublished stories.
 Fofeto Fulero
 El Resorte está de fiesta

References

External links 

Uruguayan male actors
Uruguayan male short story writers
Uruguayan short story writers
2003 deaths
Uruguayan male comedians
1928 births
Male actors from Montevideo
20th-century comedians